Robert J. Surace (pronounced ,; born April 25, 1968) is an American college football coach. He is currently the head football coach at Princeton University, a position he had held since the 2010 season.  Surace was the head football coach at Western Connecticut State University from 2000 to 2001.  He had worked as an assistant coach in the Canadian Football League (CFL) and the National Football League (NFL)

Early life
Surace was born on April 25, 1968, in Harrisburg, Pennsylvania, grew up in Millville, New Jersey and attended Millville Senior High School, where his father, Tony Surace, was a longtime football and baseball coach. He attended Princeton University, where he played on the football team from 1987 to 1989 as a center. In 1989, the Ivy League named Surace to the All-Ivy team. He graduated in 1990. Surace's wife, Lisa, was a former soccer player at Princeton, and practiced psychology in Cincinnati. The couple have a son A.J, and a daughter Allison. His brother, Brian, was the offensive coordinator at Rensselaer Polytechnic Institute.

Coaching career
Surace began coaching in 1990 as the running backs coach at Springfield College. While there, he earned a Master of Arts degree in sports management. In 1993, he was the offensive line coach at the Maine Maritime Academy. In 1994, he was an assistant coach under Forrest Gregg for the Shreveport Pirates of the Canadian Football League. In 1995, he was the offensive line coach at Rensselaer Polytechnic Institute.  In 1999, he became the offensive coordinator at Western Connecticut State University. In 2000, Surace was promoted to the head coach. In his second season, he led the Colonials to the Freedom Football Conference championship and the second round of the NCAA Division III Championship playoffs. His record at Western Connecticut State was 18–3. Surace then joined the staff of the Cincinnati Bengals in the National Football League. From 2002 to 2003, he was an offensive staff assistant, and from 2004 to 2009, an assistant offensive line coach.

Princeton hired Surace in December 2009, which made him the first alumnus as coach since Bob Casciola in 1977. In his first season, Princeton finished with a 1–9 record.

Head coaching record

References

External links
 Princeton profile

1968 births
Living people
American football centers
Cincinnati Bengals coaches
Maine Maritime Mariners football coaches
Princeton Tigers football coaches
Princeton Tigers football players
Shreveport Pirates coaches
Springfield Pride football coaches
Western Connecticut State Colonials football coaches
Millville Senior High School alumni
Sportspeople from Harrisburg, Pennsylvania
Sportspeople from Cumberland County, New Jersey
People from Millville, New Jersey
Coaches of American football from New Jersey
Players of American football from New Jersey
Players of American football from Harrisburg, Pennsylvania
American people of Italian descent